Drepanosiphum is a genus of true bugs belonging to the family Aphididae.

The species of this genus are found in Europe and Northern America.

Species:
 Drepanosiphum acerinum (Walker, 1848)
 Drepanosiphum aceris Koch, 1855
Drepanosiphum braggii Gillette, 1907
Drepanosiphum platanoidis (Schrank, 1801) 
Drepanosiphum oregonensis Granovsky, 1939

References

Aphididae
Sternorrhyncha genera